Edwall is a Swedish surname. Notable people with the surname include:

Allan Edwall (1924–1997), Swedish actor, director, author, composer, and singer
Stefan Edwall (born 1971), Swedish table hockey player

 Surnames of Swedish origin